Triplophysa pappenheimi is a species of stone loach. It is endemic to China and found in the upper reaches of the Yellow River in Qinghai province. It grows to  TL.

References

P
Endemic fauna of China
Freshwater fish of China
Fish described in 1935